These are the squads for the 1968 European Football Championship tournament in Italy, that took place between 5 June and 10 June 1968. The players' listed ages is their age on the tournament's opening day (5 June 1968).

Every player in the tournament played for a club in his native country.

England
Manager: Alf Ramsey

Italy
Manager: Ferruccio Valcareggi

Soviet Union
Manager: Mikhail Yakushin

Yugoslavia
Manager: Rajko Mitić

External links
RSSSF

1968
Squads